Moghiyon is a village and jamoat in western Tajikistan. It is part of the city of Panjakent in Sughd Region. The jamoat has a total population of 19,553 (2015). It consists of 12 villages, including Puli Girdob (the seat), Ghezani Bolo and Ghezani-Poyon.

References

Populated places in Sughd Region
Jamoats of Tajikistan